Actinocheita flicina, commonly known as palo tostado, is a plant species in the family Anacardiaceae, and the only living representative of the monotypic genus Actinocheita.

Distribution
This species is distributed from central and southwest Mexico to Honduras.

References

Anacardiaceae
Anacardiaceae genera
Monotypic Sapindales genera